Scutellastra exusta is a species of sea snail, a true limpet, a marine gastropod mollusk in the family Patellidae, one of the families of true limpets. Dead Scutellastra exusta  help to form shallow marine sediment beds.

Description
Individual Scutellastra exusta can grow up to 34.4 millimeters across and weigh up to 7.22 grams. They reproduce sexually, they feed on algae. They move via a form of mucus meditated gliding. They have a stemmata through which they can sense some visual information.

Distribution
This species can be found in the benthic zone along the coasts of the Indian Ocean, namely in eastern South Africa and in the Gulf of Oman.

References

Patellidae
Gastropods described in 1854